Anton Arghira (born 27 October 1963) is a Romanian wrestler. He competed at the 1992 Summer Olympics and the 1996 Summer Olympics.

References

External links
 

1963 births
Living people
Romanian male sport wrestlers
Olympic wrestlers of Romania
Wrestlers at the 1992 Summer Olympics
Wrestlers at the 1996 Summer Olympics
Sportspeople from Câmpulung
World Wrestling Championships medalists
20th-century Romanian people